Lodela is a 1996 dance film directed by Philippe Baylaucq, and produced in Montreal by the National Film Board of Canada. The film received eight awards, including Best Short Documentary at the Hot Docs Canadian International Documentary Festival and a Special Jury Citation for Best Canadian Short Film at the Toronto International Film Festival, citing its "formal beauty and poetic cinematic construction". The film featured dancers José Navas and Chi Long, with Navas also serving as choreographer.

Lodela draws its inspiration from the Bardo Thodol, with the film's title a corruption of "l'au-delà," a French term for the hereafter.

See also
Ora, a 2011 collaboration by Baylaucq and Navas

References

External links
 Watch Lodela at NFB.ca

1996 short films
1996 films
National Film Board of Canada short films
Quebec films
Films shot in Montreal
Canadian short documentary films
Films without speech
1990s dance films
Canadian dance films
1990s Canadian films
1990s short documentary films